The National Law Library of the Maldives is a law library in the Republic of Maldives, which opened on 30 March 2004. It is the first such library in the Maldives.

Law of the Maldives
Libraries in the Maldives
Judiciary of the Maldives